Muzdalifah is an open and level area near Mecca in the Hejazi region of Saudi Arabia that is associated with the  ("Pilgrimage"). It lies just southeast of Mina, on the route between Mina and Arafat.

Pilgrimage 
At Muzdalifah, pilgrims collect pebbles for the Stoning of the Devil.

The Sacred Monument 

The open-roofed mosque at Muzdalifah is known as "The Sacred Grove".

See also 
 Holiest sites in Islam
 Haram (site)
 List of mosques that are mentioned by name in the Quran
 Sarat Mountains
 Hijaz Mountains

References

External links 
 Mina and Muzdalifah on YouTube
 Arafah Hajj Muzdalifah Jamarah Makkah Hajj

 
Hajj
Neighborhoods of Mecca